Davidsonia johnsonii, commonly known as smooth Davidson's plum, is a small tree native to rainforests of eastern Australia. The leaves are compound, glossy and hairless. It is a very rare tree in the wild, but is cultivated for its edible fruit.

The fruit is a deep burgundy colour, with a sour flavour and is popular in jams. It is cultivated in small plantations. Due to infertile seeds it can only be propagated from cuttings or division. Hence all cultivated material is derived from clones of wild plants. Plants take at least six years to produce fruit. Some selections are heavy bearing.

References

Cunoniaceae
Oxalidales of Australia
Bushfood
Trees of Australia
Endangered flora of Australia
Flora of Queensland
Crops originating from Australia